The GP Triberg-Schwarzwald was a single-day road bicycle race held annually in June in Triberg im Schwarzwald, Germany. From 2005 to 2009 it was part of the UCI Europe Tour, being organised as 1.1 race.

Winners

External links
 Official website 

UCI Europe Tour races
Cycle races in Germany
Recurring sporting events established in 2002
2002 establishments in Germany
Sports competitions in Baden-Württemberg
2009 disestablishments in Germany
Recurring sporting events disestablished in 2009
Defunct cycling races in Germany